Jose is the English transliteration of the Hebrew and Aramaic name Yose, which is etymologically linked to Yosef or Joseph. The name was popular during the Mishnaic and Talmudic periods.

Jose ben Abin
Jose ben Akabya
Jose the Galilean
Jose ben Halafta
Jose ben Jochanan
Jose ben Joezer of Zeredah
Jose ben Saul

Given name

Male
 Jose (actor), Indian actor
 Jose Balagtas, Filipino film director
 Jose Baxter (born 1992), English footballer
 Jose Davis (born 1978), American football player
Jose Glover (died 1638), English minister and pioneer of the printing press in the New World
 Jose Kattukkaran (born 1950), Indian politician 
 Jose Kurushinkal, Indian cricket umpire
 Jose Kusugak (1950–2011), Inuk politician
 Jose Lambert (born 1941), Belgian professor
 Jose K. Mani (born 1965), Indian politician
 Jose Mugrabi (born 1939), Israeli businessman
 Jose Nandhikkara (born 1964), Indian author
 Jose Pellissery (1950–2004), Indian film actor
 Jose Chacko Periappuram (born 1958), Indian surgeon
 Jose Porunnedom (born 1956), Syro-Malabar Catholic bishop
 Jose Prakash (1925–2012), Indian actor
 Jose Slaughter (born 1960), American basketball player
 Jose Thettayil (born 1950), Indian politician
 Jose Thomas (born 1963), Indian film director
 Jose Waldberg, German spy
 Jose White (born 1973), American football player
 Jose Yu (born 1938), Hong Kong businessman

Female
 Jose Collins (1887–1958), English actress
 Jose Petrick (born 1924), Australian historian

See also
Hurricane Jose, the name of two Atlantic storms:
Hurricane Jose (1999)
Hurricane Jose (2017)
 Technology
JOSE – JSON Object Signing and Encryption.

References 

Masculine given names